Pierson Township is one of twelve townships in Vigo County, Indiana, United States. At the 2010 census, the population was 1,210 and it contained 589 housing units.

History
Frank Senour Round Barn was listed on the National Register of Historic Places in 1993.

Geography

Unincorporated communities
 Blackhawk
 Brown Jug Corner
 Hickory Island
 Lewis

Adjacent townships
 Riley Township (north)
 Perry Township, Clay County (northeast)
 Lewis Township, Clay County (southeast)
 Jackson Township, Sullivan County (south)
 Curry Township, Sullivan County (southwest)
 Linton Township (west)
 Honey Creek Township (northwest)

Cemeteries
The township contains these six cemeteries: Armstrong, Brown, Donham, Ruggles, Stephens and Taylor.

Airports and landing strips
 Ellis Fly-In

Lakes
 Fox Lake
 French Lake
 Israel Lake
 Paint Mill Lake

School districts
 Vigo County School Corporation

Political districts
 Indiana's 8th congressional district
 State House District 46
 State Senate District 39

References
 United States Census Bureau 2007 TIGER/Line Shapefiles
 United States Board on Geographic Names (GNIS)
 IndianaMap

External links

Townships in Vigo County, Indiana
Terre Haute metropolitan area
Townships in Indiana